Rachel Kelly, Baroness Altrincham, is a British author and mental health advocate. She has worked as a journalist at The Times, and is the author of the books Black Rainbow, Walking on Sunshine, The Happy Kitchen ,  Singing in the Rain and You'll Never Walk Alone.

Career
Rachel Kelly graduated from Oxford University, studying History. She then worked as a journalist for The Times newspaper in the UK. Since 2014 she has run wellbeing workshops for mental health charities MIND, as well as other organizations. Kelly now works as a mental health campaigner. She has written opinion columns for The Guardian and has served as a commentator on the BBC.

Books
In 2014 Kelly’s book Black Rainbow: How Words Healed Me — My Journey Through Depression was published in the UK and appeared on the Sunday Times bestseller list. The book details her experience with depression, including a hospitalization for suicide risk, and a multi-stage recovery. The work also serves as an autobiographical account of her life in journalism and editing. Allison Pearson reviewed the book in The Telegraph, writing that, "By reordering the seemingly random cruelty of the illness into some kind of sense, she has done a good turn to all who have made that fearful journey, and those yet to embark on it."

In 2015 her book Walking on Sunshine: 52 Small Steps to Happiness was then released. In the New Statesman, India Bourke wrote of the work that, "Drawing equally from science and art, each chapter (one for every week of the year) offers salves for both body and mind, from probiotics to poetry." The book was ranked #4 on Amazon’s best-seller list as well as #1. The chapters revolve around activities and other items that have helped Kelly in the past in dealing with her depression.

In 2017 Kelly co-authored the book The Happy Kitchen – Good Mood Food with nutritionist Alice MackIntosh. The book discusses the role of nutrition in the treatment of depression, and includes recipes that were developed for that reason.

In 2019 she published Singing in the Rain: 52 Practical Steps to Happiness – An Inspirational Workbook. In The Telegraph, James Le Fanu wrote of the work that, "Since being incapacitated by a couple of severe episodes of depression in her thirties, journalist and Telegraph contributor Rachel Kelly has been canvassing fellow sufferers through her website and workshops, inviting them to report simple practical ways they have found to keep themselves on an even keel. These range through rising early to allow for a leisurely start to the day, wearing colourful, morale-boosting clothes, making a point of identifying and enjoying simple pleasures and reciting, when stressed, private prayers or mantras."

Personal life
Kelly is married to Sebastian Grigg, 4th Baron Altrincham, with whom she has five children. As the wife of a peer, the is styled as "The Right Honourable, The Lady Altrincham"."

References

Living people
British baronesses
Alumni of the University of Oxford
21st-century British writers
Year of birth missing (living people)